Fidji Simo (born 5 October 1985) is a French businessperson and the CEO of Instacart. Prior to taking that position, she was head of the Facebook app at Facebook, and Vice President of Video, Games, and Monetization. She co-founded and is currently president of The Metrodora Foundation, a health clinic and research institute. She also co-founded Women in Product, a nonprofit that supports women in product management. She was previously on the boards of Cirque du Soleil and L.A. Dance Project.

Personal life and education 

Simo grew up in Sète, in the south of France, and now lives in California. She was the first member of her family to graduate from high school, and holds a master of management degree from HEC Paris. She spent the last year of her program at UCLA’s Anderson School of Business.

Simo co-founded Women in Product, a nonprofit organization for women in product management. The organization works to advance the careers of women in technology and advocates for equal representation in the workplace. Previously Simo was on the boards of the L.A. Dance Project and Cirque du Soleil.

In October 2021, Simo co-founded the Metrodora Foundation, a health clinic and research institute. Simo is now the President of the foundation, and is also a board member and investor. The Metrodora Foundation is focused on treating patients with neuroimmune conditions.

In December 2021, Simo joined Shopify's board of directors.

Career

eBay 
Simo worked at eBay from 2007-2011 as part of the strategy team. While at eBay, she built out the company’s local commerce and classified-advertising initiatives.

Facebook 
Prior to joining Instacart, Simo worked at Facebook, where she was Head of the Facebook App and oversaw a team of 6,000 people. Prior to that, she was Vice President of Video, Games and Monetization, where she led a team of 700 engineers and product managers and oversaw the launch of the video platforms Facebook Live and Watch. Simo joined Facebook from eBay in 2011.

Instacart 
Simo joined Instacart’s board of directors in January 2021, and was appointed as the company’s CEO in July. She started in the new role in August, replacing Apoorva Mehta, who became the executive chairman of the board. 

In July 2022, Instacart appointed Simo to succeed Apoorva Mehta as the Board Chair once the company completed its initial public offering.

References 

Living people
Facebook employees
University of California, Los Angeles alumni
HEC Paris alumni
1985 births
People from Sète
21st-century French businesspeople